Melter Jiki Tais is the sixth Archbishop and Primate of the Church of the Province of South East Asia since 9 February 2020 and the Bishop of its Sabah Diocese since 2015, being the first native of Sabah to be installed as bishop of that diocese.

Priesthood 
The archbishop was ordained to the priesthood in 1993 and was appointed to many positions in the Diocese of Sabah, including Priest-in-Charge of St Margaret’s Church in Keningau and St Peter’s Church in Tenom, Rector of St Mark’s Church in Lahad Datu and St Luke’s Mission District in Telupid.

References 

People from Sabah
Year of birth missing (living people)
Living people